Václav Matěj Kramerius (he preferred to write his name in old form as Kraméryus; February 9, 1753 in Klatovy, Bohemia – March 22, 1808 in Prague) was a Czech publisher, journalist and writer, one of the most important early figures of the Czech National Revival.

Born as Matěj Valentin Kramerius to the Roman Catholic family of burghers of Klatovy town, southwestern Bohemia, he went to the Jesuit high school there and then studied philosophy and law at the Charles-Ferdinand University in Prague (1778–1780). During his studies he earned money by cataloguing the library of a nobleman, which gave him access to old Czech books. From 1786 he worked as a journalist in the only and oldest Czech language weekly Pražské poštovské noviny but in 1789 he started a newspaper of his own (renamed to Krameriusovy c. k. vlastenecké noviny in 1791), which he published regularly until his death. As a result of its commercial success, he was able to buy a printing shop and subsequently established a publishing house (named "Česká expedice") in 1795. Most Czech language books of his time were published there. Kramerius himself wrote about 80 books of varying quality; most successful were his calendars for farmers.

His son Václav Rodomil Kramerius continued the work of his father.

Notes

External links
 Biography 

1753 births
1808 deaths
People from Klatovy
Czech publishers (people)